Polygala vulgaris, known as the common milkwort, is a herbaceous perennial plant of the genus Polygala in the family Polygalaceae.

Description
The biological form of Polygala vulgaris is hemicryptophyte scapose, as its overwintering buds are situated just below the soil surface and the floral axis is more or less erect with a few leaves.

Polygala vulgaris reaches on average  in height. The stems have many branches and are woody at the base. It has alternating pointed leaves, almost glabrous, 2 to 4 mm wide and 10 to 20 mm long. Basal leaves are spatulate, with rounded apex, while the upper leaves are lanceolate.

The flowers are gathered in long terminal inflorescences. The colour of the corolla varies between blue and violet, it can rarely occur in purple forms. The flower's outer three sepals are normally small, green and insignificant, whilst the inner two sepals are bigger. The inner sepals are usually shorter than the petals. The stalks of the eight stamens are joined together to form a tube, and united with this tube, one on either side, are two tiny petals. On the lower side of the flower lies the third petal; it too, is joined to the stamen tube, but it is larger, and fringed. The flowering period extends from May through July.

Common milkwort is quite similar to the heath milkwort (Polygala serpyllifolia), but in this species the inner sepals are usually longer than the petals. The heath milkwort can be all the same colours except for white. These four possible colours account for the milkworts' Irish folk-name of 'four sisters'.

Distribution
This species is widespread in Europe, in Asia up to Japan and in US (Oregon and Michigan).

Habitat
Common milkwort grows in meadows, slopes, edges of forests, heaths, sunny woods, dunes and grasslands. It is frequent in patches on calcerous grassland,  from sea level up to 2200 meters.

Culture
In Scandinavia, it was called Freya's hair, but after the introduction of Christianity, it was renamed after the Virgin Mary.

Medicinal uses
According to Classical and Renaissance writers common milkwort was used medicinally as an infusion to increase the flow of a nursing mother's milk.

Subspecies
 Polygala vulgaris subsp. alpestris (Reichenb.) Rouy & Fouc. [= Polygala alpestris Reichenb. ]
 Polygala vulgaris subsp. comosa (Schkuhr) C$elak. [= Polygala comosa Schkuhr ]
 Polygala vulgaris subsp. rosea  [= Polygala nicaeensis subsp. caesalpini Bubani ]
 Polygala vulgaris subsp. nicaeensis (Koch) Rouy & Fouc. [= Polygala nicaeensis Koch ]
 Polygala vulgaris subsp. calliptera (Le Grand) Rouy & Fouc. [= Polygala vulgaris subsp. calliptera L. ]
 Polygala vulgaris var. calliptera Le Grand [= Polygala vulgaris subsp. calliptera (Le Grand) Rouy & Fouc. ] 
 Polygala vulgaris subsp. collina (Reichenb.) Borbás [= Polygala vulgaris subsp. collina'' L. ]

Gallery

References

 The Wild Flower Key British Isles-N.W. Europe by Francis Rose, page 132
 Field Guide to the Wild Flowers of Britain - The Reader's Digest Association Limited, London, 2004
 Acta Plantarum

External links
 Biolib
 Schede di Botanica

vulgaris
Plants described in 1753
Taxa named by Carl Linnaeus
Flora of Europe
Flora of Asia
Flora of Japan
Flora of the United States
Flora of Oregon
Flora of Michigan
Flora without expected TNC conservation status